Robert Clark "Bob" Young (January 15, 1916 – February 3, 2011) was an American athlete who competed mainly in the 400 metres. He competed for the United States in the 1936 Summer Olympics held in Berlin, Germany in the 4×400 metre relay where he won the silver medal with his teammates Harold Cagle, Edward O’Brien and Alfred Fitch. Young was the youngest member of the team. In the collegiate arena Young competed for UCLA. He was born and died in Bakersfield, California.

References

External links
 Olympian ran with Owens, proudly insulted Hitler, obituary by Steven Mayer in The Bakersfield Californian, February 3, 2011
 The Guy Who Gave Hitler the Finger

1916 births
2011 deaths
American male sprinters
Olympic silver medalists for the United States in track and field
Sportspeople from Bakersfield, California
Track and field athletes from California
Athletes (track and field) at the 1936 Summer Olympics
Medalists at the 1936 Summer Olympics